Julius Bergman (born November 2, 1995) is a Swedish professional ice hockey defenceman who is currently playing under contract for Södertälje SK in the HockeyAllsvenskan (Allsv). Bergman was selected by the San Jose Sharks in the second round (46th overall) of the 2014 NHL Entry Draft.

Playing career
Bergman grew up playing youth hockey in Sweden, initially with the junior teams affiliated with Karlskrona HK before being loaned to the Frölunda HC organization, where he played firstly with the J18 team before being moved to the J20 team. Bergman made his debut with the senior Frölunda team during the 2013 European Trophy.

Bergman signed a three-year entry-level contract with the San Jose Sharks on July 16, 2014. He spent the 2014–15 season playing major junior hockey in Canada with the London Knights of the Ontario Hockey League. Bergman played three seasons with the Sharks' American Hockey League (AHL) affiliate  San Jose Barracuda. He had his best season in 2017–18, scoring ten goals and ten assists.

On June 19, 2018, he was traded by the Sharks alongside Mikkel Bødker and a sixth-round pick of the 2020 NHL Entry Draft to the Ottawa Senators in exchange for Mike Hoffman, Cody Donaghey and a fifth-round pick in 2020. After attending his first training camp with the Senators, Bergman was assigned to begin the 2018–19 season with AHL affiliate, the Belleville Senators. Bergman was unable to replicate his previous contributions in the AHL, posting just 6 assists in 33 games from the blueline. In February, Swedish sports paper Sportbladet reported that Bergman intended to return to Frölunda at the end of the season.

On February 22, 2019, Bergman was included in the trade of Matt Duchene by the Senators to the Columbus Blue Jackets in exchange for prospects Vitaly Abramov, Jonathan Davidsson and two conditional first-round picks in 2019 and 2020. He was immediately re-assigned to the Blue Jackets' AHL affiliate, the Cleveland Monsters. Before Bergman could make his debut with the Monsters, the Blue Jackets traded him at the trade deadline to the New York Rangers along with fourth- and seventh-round picks in the 2019 NHL Entry Draft in exchange for Adam McQuaid. Bergman played 10 games to play out the remainder of the season with the Rangers AHL affiliate, the Hartford Wolf Pack.

Unable to break through to the NHL, as an impending restricted free agent from the Rangers, Bergman opted to return to continue his career in Sweden, signing a two-year contract with his original club, Frölunda HC, on May 8, 2019. In his return to Frölunda, Bergman struggled to find his role on the club in the 2019–20 season, contributing with just 6 assists through 42 regular season games before the COVID-19 pandemic cancelled the playoffs.

On 21 April 2020, Bergman terminated the final year of his contract with Frölunda, opting to sign a two-year deal with Finnish club, Lahti Pelicans of the Liiga.

During the 2022–23 season, Bergman went scoreless in 28 regular season games with Brynäs IF, before opting to move to second tier HockeyAllsvenskan club, Södertälje SK, on a three-year contract on 13 January 2023.

Career statistics

Regular season and playoffs

International

References

External links

1995 births
Brynäs IF players
Belleville Senators players
Hartford Wolf Pack players
Karlskrona HK players
Lahti Pelicans players
Living people
London Knights players
Frölunda HC players
San Jose Barracuda players
San Jose Sharks draft picks
Södertälje SK players
Ice hockey people from Stockholm
Swedish expatriate ice hockey players in Canada
Swedish expatriate ice hockey players in the United States
Swedish ice hockey defencemen
Worcester Sharks players